Imbricaria conularis, common name the cone mitre, is a species of sea snail, a marine gastropod mollusc in the family Mitridae, the miters or miter snails.

Description
The length of the shell varies between 13 mm and 26 mm.

Distribution
This marine species occurs off Australia, the Philippines, Papua New Guinea and French Polynesia.

References

 Cernohorsky W.O. (1991). The Mitridae of the world. Part 2. The subfamily Mitrinae concluded and subfamilies Imbricariinae and Cylindromitrinae. Monographs of Marine Mollusca. 4: ii + 164 pp.
 Tsuchiya K. (2017). Family Mitridae. Pp. 973–982, in: T. Okutani (ed.), Marine Mollusks in Japan, ed. 2. 2 vols. Tokai University Press. 1375 pp
 Poppe G.T. & Tagaro S.P. (2008). Mitridae. Pp. 330–417, in: G.T. Poppe (ed.), Philippine marine mollusks, volume 2. Hackenheim: ConchBooks. 848 pp.

External links
 
 Lamarck [J.B.M.de]. (1811). Suite de la détermination des espèces de Mollusques testacés. Mitre (Mitra.). Annales du Muséum National d'Histoire Naturelle. 17: 195-222
 Schumacher C.F. (1817). Essai d'un nouveau système des habitations des vers testacés. Schultz, Copenghagen. iv + 288 pp., 22 pls.
 Fedosov A., Puillandre N., Herrmann M., Kantor Yu., Oliverio M., Dgebuadze P., Modica M.V. & Bouchet P. (2018). The collapse of Mitra: molecular systematics and morphology of the Mitridae (Gastropoda: Neogastropoda). Zoological Journal of the Linnean Society. 183(2): 253-337

Mitridae
Gastropods described in 1811